Free Cell is the second album by American musician Lina Tullgren, released on August 23, 2019, on Captured Tracks.

Critical reception

Free Cell received positive contemporary reviews. Emma Madden at Pitchfork said, "the Queens musician's second album uses avant-pop songwriting to capture the nuances of tedium, to strangely captivating effect". In a review for AllMusic, Timothy Monger compared the album favourably with its predecessor, saying, "Artistically, Tullgren shows a remarkable amount of growth between releases, making for a sophomore gem".

Track listing

References

2020 albums
Captured Tracks albums